Archaephippus is an extinct genus of prehistoric spadefish that lived from the early to middle Eocene.  Several exquisitely preserved fossils have been found from the Monte Bolca lagerstatten.

See also

 Prehistoric fish
 List of prehistoric bony fish

References

Eocene fish
Ephippidae
Eocene fish of Europe